The Finnish–Novgorodian wars were a series of conflicts between Finnic tribes in eastern Fennoscandia and the Republic of Novgorod from the 11th or 12th century to the early 13th century.

The wars' effect on the Finns' society contributed to the eventual Swedish conquest of western Finland in around 1249. The term used in Russian chronicles to refer to Novgorod's enemy, Yem, is unclear and probably referred to several different groups, even though etymologically it derives from the Finnish word Häme, which means Tavastia. Some of the groups identified as Yem may have been the inhabitants of Tavastland in south-central Finland, the West Finns in general, or a sub-group of Karelians on the northern coast of the Ladoga who descended from western Finns who had moved to the area earlier.

Early developments
The only known written sources on the Yem-Novgorodian wars are contained in the medieval Russian chronicles. The Novgorodians and Yem had frequent conflicts from the 11th or 12th century onwards. The eastern Finnic Votes, Korela (interpreted as Karelians in general or more specifically as the Karelians on the southwest coast of the Ladoga) and Izhorians are all mentioned as allies of Novgorod, said to have been fighting against the Yem even without Novgorod's direct involvement, possibly over control of land area in central and eastern Finland; this territorial feud manifested in annual retaliatory expeditions that featured merciless treatment of the settlers of the opposing tribe.

The earliest possible mention of hostilities is from the Laurentian Codex which records in passing that the Novgorodian Prince Vladimir Yaroslavich was at war with the "Yam" in 1042 AD. The Yam are also mentioned as tributaries to Novgorod in the Primary Chronicle, but they disappear from sources later on.

Conflicts certainly began in the early 12th century, however information on them remains very scarce.

According to the Novgorod First Chronicle, another Prince of Novgorod, Vsevolod Mstislavich, and his troops from Novgorod were at war with Yem during a great famine in 1123. The chronicle leaves any further developments of the conflict open, including the whereabouts of the fight.

Yem pillaged Novgorodian territory in 1142, but were defeated near Ladoga with 400 casualties. Coincidentally or not, Swedes attacked the Novgorodians in the same year as well. The Korela, now under Novgorodian influence, were at war with Yem in the following year, but were forced to flee, losing two ships.

Yem attacked Russian soil again in 1149 with 1000 men. Novgorodians, totaling 500, went in pursuit of the Yem, utterly defeating them with Votes, a Finnic tribe in alliance with Novgorod. Votes, today almost extinct, lived south of the present-day Saint Petersburg, probably making this the deepest attack that Yem ever made into Novgorodian territory.

After a long pause in open hostilities—at least in the chronicles—a Novgorodian called Vyshata Vasilyevich led his troops against Yem in 1186, returning unharmed with prisoners. It is not clear whether he took his forces to fight in the land of Yem or to defend his country against an intrusion. Reasons for the renewed fighting have not been identified.

Korela accompanied Novgorodians for yet another attack against the Yem in 1191. This time the fighting is clearly said to have taken place "the land of the Yem", the first such entry in Russian chronicles. The assailants "burned the country and killed the cattle". Very hypothetically this may have been the same attack that was mentioned in a much later Swedish chronicle, the mid-16th century Chronicon episcoporum Finlandensium by Bishop Paulus Juusten, that records the Novgorodians burning "Turku" in 1198, at the time of Bishop Folquinus. Russian chronicles have no information about a conflict that year. The town of Turku did not exist before the end of the 13th century.
Turku, the name, originally means "market place". The modern term 'suomen Turku' (Finland's Turku), is believed to be an old term indicating that there originally several 'Turkus' in other parts of the country.

After this, there is no information on further Novgorodian conflicts for several decades. It is also impossible to confirm whether the 1191 war resulted in a brief Novgorodian rule in parts of Finland or Karelia. However, a later chronicle entry from the mid-1220s said that Novgorodian princes had not been able to dwell in the land of Yem.

Swedish and Papal involvement

At the same time, Sweden and Novgorod were in conflict as well. Pope Alexander III, in his letter to the Archbishop of Uppsala and Jarl Gottorm of Sweden in 1171 (or 1172), perhaps refers to the Finns' struggle against Novgorod by demanding Sweden take over Finnish fortresses in exchange for protection. In the late 15th century, historian Ericus Olai claimed that Bishop Kol of Linköping (died c. 1196) had been the "Jarl of Finland" (Dux Finlandiae), possibly leading Swedish troops temporarily situated in Finland. He may have been in a military role similar to that of Jon Jarl, who allegedly spent nine years overseas fighting against Novgorodians and Ingrians at the end of the 12th century.

Also noteworthy is the so-called First Swedish Crusade, which, according to several 15th-century sources, took place in 1150. The crusade is only known from later legends that presented the expedition (if it ever took place) as a Christian mission, headed by a saint king to baptize heathens. However, it seems to have followed the exceptionally edgy 1140s with both the Yem and Swedes fighting against Novgorod. Some historians have seen it as a direct reaction to the failed Yem expedition in 1149, associating it with the co-operation mentioned by the Pope 20 years later.

In 1221, Pope Honorius III was again worried about the situation after receiving alarming information from the Archbishop of Uppsala. He authorized the unnamed Bishop of Finland to establish a trade embargo against the "barbarians" that threatened the Christianity in Finland. The nationality of the "barbarians", presumably a citation from Archbishop's earlier letter, remains unknown, and was not necessarily known even by the Pope. However, as the trade embargo was widened eight years later, it was specifically said to be against the Novgorodians.

Russian sources mention Swedish-Yem co-operation in 1240 at the earliest; it was then that  were mentioned as one of the Swedes' allies in the little-documented Battle of the Neva. The first reliable mention of Yem being a part of Swedish forces is from 1256, seven years after the conventional dating of the so-called Second Swedish Crusade.

Final war
The final known conflict between Yem and Novgorod took place in the 1220s, following decades of peace, at least in the chronicles. After having secured his power in Novgorod by 1222, Grand Prince Yaroslav II of Vladimir organized a series of attacks against Estonia, Yem and Karelia. The offensive against Yem took place in winter 1226–27.

The same winter Yaroslav, son of Vsevolod left Novgorod over the sea against Yem where no else Novgorodian prince had been able to dwell; and he conquered the land and returned to Novgorod praising God with many prisoners. When those who were accompanying him could not handle all the prisoners, they killed some of them but released many more.

The Yem retaliatory expedition in summer 1228 against Ladoga, allegedly with more than 2000 men ended in disaster, as described by the Novgorod First Chronicle.

The Yem came to Lake Ladoga to war, and word about that came to Novgorod on the Ascension Day of the Christ (6.8). And Novgorodians took their barges and rowed to Ladoga with prince Yaroslav. Vladislav, the bailiff at Ladoga, and the people of Ladoga did not wait for the Novgorodians, but went after them (Finns) in boats where they were fighting, met with them and fought them; and then came night, and they (people of Ladoga) landed on an island, but Finns were on the coast with prisoners; for they had been fighting close to the lake near the landing place, and in Olonets. The same night they asked for peace, but the bailiff and the people of Ladoga did not grant it; and they killed all the prisoners and ran into forests, after abandoning their ships. Many of them fell there, but their boats were burned. -- And of those who had come, 2000 or more were killed, God knows; and the rest (who had not fled) were all killed.

The war seems to have been the end of independent Yem-Novgorodian conflicts. Based on Papal letters from 1229, the unknown Bishop of Finland took advantage of the chaotic situation by taking over non-Christian places of worship and moving the see to a "more suitable" location. On the bishop's request, the Pope also enforced a trade embargo against Novgorodians on the Baltic Sea, at least in Visby, Riga and Lübeck. A few years later, the Pope also requested the Livonian Brothers of the Sword send troops to protect Finland. Whether any knights ever arrived remains unknown.

Novgorodian wars were a factor contributing to the eventual Swedish conquest of Finland around 1249. Under Swedish rule, the wars continued to rage in Finland as a part of Swedish-Novgorodian Wars.

See also

 Early Finnish wars
 List of Finnish wars

References 
 
 

Wars involving the Novgorod Republic
Novgorod Republic
11th-century conflicts
12th-century conflicts
13th-century conflicts
11th century in Russia
12th century in Russia
13th century in Russia
12th century in Finland
13th century in Finland